The 2012–13 MOL Liga season was the fifth season of the MOL Liga, a multi-national ice hockey league consisting of teams from Hungary, Romania, and Slovakia. Seven teams participated in the league, and DAB-Docler won the championship.

The league also served as the Hungarian Championship for 2012-13. DAB-Docler, the MOL Liga champion, was also the Hungarian national champion.

Regular season

Playoffs

Semifinals

Final

References

External links
 MOL Liga official website

2
Erste Liga (ice hockey) seasons
2